Public transport in Adelaide, South Australia, is managed by the State Government's Department for Infrastructure & Transport, branded as Adelaide Metro. Today bus services are operated by contractors: Busways, SouthLink, Torrens Connect and Torrens Transit.

Historically bus services in Adelaide were operated by private operators. In the 1950s, the Municipal Tramways Trust began operating buses to replace its trams. In the mid-1970s, the Municipal Tramways Trust took over the services of the private operators. In the mid-1990s, provision of services was contracted out to the private sector with TransAdelaide maintaining responsibility for service levels. The city's transport is now managed by the Department of Planning, Transport & Infrastructure, branded as Adelaide Metro.

Operators 
 Routes 100-197X, 230, 232, 281-288, 333, 350, 371-376, 579, 580, B10, B12, H20-H33, J1-J8, N22, N30, N178, W90, W91, X30, 200-209F, 235-273, 300-320, 361, 600-605, 645, 646, 500-591C, C1, C2, G10-G40, M44, N1,N10, N21, N202, N254, N262, N502, N541 and N542 are operated by Torrens Transit.
 Routes 222-229, 400-494, 560-565, 640, 681-683, 719-756, 820-894, 900, N224, N721, T721, T722 and T840-T863 are operated by SouthLink.
 Routes 805, 806, 807 and 808 are operated by LinkSA.
 Trains and Trams are operated by TransAdelaide.

Bus Routes

Through-City routes 
  West Lakes Interchange to Adelaide via Grange Road, Adelaide
Route 110 timetable
 110 operates West Lakes Interchange to City
 
 West Lakes Interchange to City via Grange Road and Military Road
  Blair Athol to Marion Interchange via Prospect Road, City and Goodwood Road
  G10A operates Blair Athol to Colonel Light Gardens (stop 18 Goodwood Road) only 
  G10B operates Blair Athol to Bedford Park (stop 26) only, then continues as a G20 or G21 
  Flinders University to Golden Grove via Goodwood Road, City and O-Bahn Busway
  G40M operates Flinders University to Tea Tree Plaza only
  Paradise to Glenelg via The Parade, City and Marion Road
  H20R terminates in Richmond 
  H20C terminates in the city 
  Wattle Park to Henley Beach South via The Parade, City and Henley Beach Road
  H22C terminates in the City 
  H22L operates Wattle Park to Lockleys only 
  Paradise to West Lakes Interchange via Rostrevor, City and Henley Beach Road
  H30C terminates in the City 
  H30S terminates in Newton
  Henley Beach to Rostrevor via Henley Beach Road, City and Firle
 H33C operates Henley Beach/ Rostrevor to City
  Marion Interchange to Golden Grove via Marion Road, City and O-Bahn Busway
  M44T  terminates at Tea Tree Plaza Interchange 
  M44C terminates in the City 
  Marion Interchange to Paradise via Winston Avenue, City and Sixth Avenue
  W90M terminates in Marden 
  Saint Marys to Marden via Winston Avenue, City and Sixth Avenue
  W91C terminates in the City 
  Paradise to West Lakes Interchange via Rostrevor, City and Henley Beach Road Express between Stop 8 Henley Beach Rd and City
  X30C terminates in the City 
  X30S terminates in Newton

Transit Link

TransitLink bus services are limited stop express bus routes, operating to and from the city.
  Smithfield Interchange via Main North Rd
  Noarlunga Centre via South Road
 T721X operates Noarlunga Centre to City running express from Stop 48 Main South Road
  Seaford via South Road and Woodcroft
  Mount Barker via South Eastern Freeway  stops at all city stops, stops 5, 8, 13/14, 16, 24, 24A, 25, 62, then all stops 
  Nairne via South Eastern Freeway and Mount Barker  stops at all city stops, stops 5, 8, 13/14, 16, 24, 24A, 25, 62, then all stops 
  Mount Barker via South Eastern Freeway  stops at all city stops, stops 5, 8, 13/14, 16, 24, 24A, 25, 55, 62 then all stops 
  Aldgate  via South Eastern Freeway and Stirling  stops at all city stops, stops 5, 8, 13/14, 16, 24, 24A, 25, 36, then all stops

O-Bahn Routes

O-Bahn City Routes 
(Routes 500, 501, 556, 557, 559 and ending with 'X' only operate during peak periods, 6:30am–9:00am and 2:00pm–6:00pm, 545 only limited services, 541, 544 off peak only)
  Elizabeth Interchange via Salisbury Interchange, Bridge Road and O-Bahn. Limited stop service. Operates Monday-Friday. 
  Mawson Interchange to via Montague Road and O-Bahn. Limited stop service. Operates Monday-Friday.
  Salisbury Interchange to via Bridge Road and O-Bahn. Limited stop service. Operates 7 days.
  Salisbury Interchange via Bridge Road and O-Bahn.  Operates Monday-Friday. Service operates express between stop 28 Sudholz Road and City (no pick up or set down).
  Tea Tree Plaza via O-Bahn Busway and Holden Hill
  Tea Tree Plaza via Para Hills
  Tea Tree Plaza via O-Bahn Busway and Para Hills
  Tea Tree Plaza via O-Bahn Busway and North East Road
  Northgate via O-Bahn Busway, Klemzig Interchange and OG Road
  Fairview Park/Golden Grove  via O-Bahn Busway and Hancock Road
  Golden Grove/Fairview Park via O-Bahn Busway and Hancock Road Express From Tea Tree Plaza Interchange
  Fairview Park via O-Bahn Busway, Elizabeth Street and Yatala Vale Road Express Form Tea Tree Plaza Interchange
  Surrey Downs via O-Bahn Busway and Riverside Drive Express Form Tea Tree Plaza Interchange
  Golden Grove via O-Bahn Busway and Ladywood Road
  Golden Grove via O-Bahn Busway and Ladywood Road Express from Tea Tree Plaza Interchange
  Golden Grove via O-Bahn Busway and McIntyre Road
  Golden Grove via O-Bahn Busway and McIntyre Road 
  Para Hills via O-Bahn Busway, Tea Tree Plaza and Kelly Road. Returns as route 546X.
  City via Kelly Road, Tea Tree Plaza and O-Bahn Busway Express form Tea Tree Plaza Interchange. Returns as route 546.
  Greenwith via O-Bahn Busway and Golden Grove Road
  Tea Tree Plaza Interchange via O-Bahn Busway and Tolley Road
  Tea Tree Plaza Interchange via O-Bahn Busway, Perseverance Road and North East Road
  Tea Tree Plaza Interchange via O-Bahn Busway, Perseverance Road and North East Road Express from Tea Tree Plaza Interchange
  Tea Tree Plaza via O-Bahn Busway, Dernancourt, Lyons Road, Awonga Road, Lower North East Road and Smart Road.
 559S Terminates at stop 44 Smart Road, St Agnes
  Elizabeth via O-Bahn Busway, Golden Grove Village and Main North Road
  J1X Golden Grove via O-Bahn Busway. Express form Stop 50 Golden Grove Road. Limited Services Start at Paradise Interchange. 
 J1T terminates at Tea Tree Plaza
 J1G terminates at Golden Grove
  Greenwith to via O-Bahn Busway and Golden Grove Village
  Greenwith via O-Bahn Busway Express From Stop 50 Golden Grove Road

North Eastern and O-Bahn Feeders 
  Mawson Lakes To Ingle Farm via Montague Road.
  Tea Tree Plaza to Paradise Interchange Via Holden Hill
  Tea Tree Plaza to Paradise Interchange Via Para Hills
 506H terminates at stop 64 Kelley Road, Modbury North.
  Tea Tree Plaza to Paradise Interchange via North East Road
  Fairview Park/Golden Grove to Tea Tree Plaza via Hancock Road
 541G extends to Golden Grove
  Fairview Park to Tea Tree Plaza via Elizabeth Street and Yatala Vale Road
  Surrey Downs to Tea Tree Plaza via Riverside Drive
 543G Terminates at stop 58A Grenfell Road, Surrey Downs
  Golden Grove to Tea Tree Plaza via McIntyre Road
  Greenwith To Tea Tree Plaza via Golden Grove Road. Continues as/originates from route C2 to/from Golden Grove Village.
  Tea Tree Plaza Interchange to Paradise Interchange via Tolley Road
  Tea Tree Plaza Interchange to Paradise Interchange via Perseverance Road and North East Road
  Tea Tree Plaza to Paradise via Dernancourt, Lyons Road, Awonga Road, Lower North East Road and Smart Road.
 559S Terminates at stop 44 Smart Road, St Agnes
  Paradise to Athelstone via Gorge Road
  Golden Grove-Greenwith Anti-Clockwise Loop via Atlantis Drive, The Golden Way, Thornton Drive, Green Valley Drive and Reuben Richardson Drive.
  Golden Grove-Greenwith Clockwise Loop via Atlantis Drive, The Golden Way, Thornton Drive, Green Valley Drive and Reuben Richardson Drive.

Eastern Routes 
  Glen Osmond via The Parade and Portrush Road
  Stonyfell via Kensington Road and Hallett Road
  Burnside via Kensington Road and Glynburn Road
  Glen Osmond via Grant Avenue and Portrush Road
  144G terminates at stop 7 Grant Avenue, Toorak Gardens 
  Beaumont via Dulwich Avenue and Devereux Road
  Paradise Interchange via Payneham Road
  Athelstone via Payneham Road, Cresdee Road and Gorge Road
  176G operates City to stop 27 Gorge Road, Paradise 
  Paradise Interchange via Payneham Road, Montacute Road and Lower Athelstone Road
  178A operates Paradise Interchange to stop 34 Collus Road Athelstone 
  178S operates City to stop 26 Montacute Road, Rostrevor 
  178M operates City to stop 33M Maryville Road Athelstone 
  Paradise Interchange via Payneham Road, Montacute Road and Lower Athelstone Road  Express to Stop 17 Payneham Road 
  Paradise Interchange via The Parade and Glynburn Road
  Auldana via The Parade and Kensington Road
  Auldana via The Parade

Western Routes 
All buses terminating in the west of Adelaide

City Buses 
  West Lakes Interchange via Grange Road and Crittenden Road
  Port Adelaide via Crittenden Road, West Lakes Interchange and Bartley Terrace
  Port Adelaide via Crittenden Road, Tapleys Hill Road and Old Port Road
  Osborne via Port Road, Port Adelaide and Victoria Road
  150B terminates at stop 48 Fletcher Road, Largs Bay
  150P terminates at Port Adelaide 
  West Lakes Interchange via Port Road and West Lakes Boulevard
  Largs Bay via Port Road, West Lakes Interchange and Military Road
 157X operates Largs Bay to City running express from West Lakes Interchange
  West Beach via Sir Donald Bradman Drive
  Port Adelaide via Torrens Road, South Road, Regency Road, Armada Arndale Shopping Centre and Addison Road
  Port Adelaide via Torrens Road, South Road, Regency Road, Armada Arndale Shopping Centre and Newcastle Street
  232R terminates at stop 36 Grand Junction Road, Rosewater
  Mansfield Park via Hawker Street, Armada Arndale Shopping Centre, Liberty Grove and Grand Junction Road
  251A operates Mansfield Park to Armada Arndale Shopping Centre only
  Port Adelaide via Hawker Street, Armada Arndale Shopping Centre, Liberty Grove and Eastern Parade
  252A operates Port Adelaide to Armada Arndale Shopping Centre only
  Mansfield Park via Hawker Street, Armada Arndale Shopping Centre and Hanson Road
 253X operates Mansfield Park to City running express from Armada Arndale Shopping Centre
  Port Adelaide via Hawker Street, Armada Arndale Shopping Centre and Hanson Road
 254X operates Port Adelaide to City running express from Armada Arndale Shopping Centre
  254A operates Mansfield Park to Armada Arndale Shopping Centre only
  Henley Beach via Ashley Street, Valetta Road and Cheadle Street
  286A terminates at stop 12 Ashley Street, Underdale
  Henley Beach via Ashley Street, Valetta Road and Marlborough Street
  West Lakes Interchange via Ashley Street, Valetta Road and Trimmer Parade
  288S Terminates at stop 28B Tapleys Hill Road, Seaton
  West Lakes Interchange via Grange Road and Military Road
  Henley Beach South via Henley Beach

Western Feeder Services 
  Port Adelaide to North Haven via Glanville Station and Military Road
 333B operates North Haven to Port Adelaide only. Terminates Stop 39 Church Street, Port Adelaide
 333L operates Port Adelaide to Largs Bay only. Terminates Stop 49 Military Road, Largs Bay
  West Lakes Interchange to Largs Bay via Frederick Road
  West Lakes-Tennyson Loop via West Lakes Boulevard and Military Road
  West Lakes-Tennyson Loop via West Lakes Boulevard and Military Road
  Delfin Island Loop via Corcoran Drive and Island Drive

Northern Routes 
Buses terminating to the North of Adelaide

City Buses 
  Ingle Farm via Hampstead Road and Wright Road
  Ingle Farm via Hampstead Road and Wright Road. (Designated F stop; stop 16 Hampstead Road)
  Tea Tree Plaza via Hampstead Road, Beovich Road and Milne Road.
  203B terminates at stop 47 Baldock Road, Ingle Farm
  Tea Tree Plaza via Hampstead Road, Beovich Road and Milne Road. (Designated F stop; stop 16 Hampstead Road)
  Northgate via Galway Avenue, Regency Road and Fosters Road route 206 Northgate
  Paradise Interchange via Galway Avenue, Fosters Road and Sir Ross Smith Boulevard
 208B terminates at stop 19 Regency Road, Broadview
 208N terminates at stop 26 Folland Avenue, Northgate
  Tea Tree Plaza via Main North Road, Regency Road, Hampstead Road and Milne Road. (Designated F stop; stop 17A Regency Road)
  Mawson Lakes via Main North Road
  Elizabeth via Main North Road, Mawson Lakes and Salisbury Interchange.
  Elizabeth via Main North Road, Mawson Lakes and Salisbury Interchange. (Designated F stop; stop 17 Main North Road)
 224X operates Elizabeth to City running express from Mawson Lakes to Stop 29 Main North Road then to City
  Salisbury via Port Wakefield Road, Mawson Lakes and Northbri Avenue. (Designated F stop; stop 17 Main North Road)
 225X operates Salisbury to City running express from Mawson Lakes to Stop 29 Main North Road then to City
  Smithfield via Main North Road, Yorketown Road and Hamblyn Road.
  Smithfield via Main North Road, Yorketown Road and Hamblyn Road. (Designated F stop; stop 17 Main North Road)
 228X operates Smithfield to City running express from Stop 29 Main North Road
  Para Hills via Main North Road and Pooraka. (Designated F stop; stop 17 Main North Road)
 229X operates Para Hills to City running express from stop 29 Main North Road
  Kilburn via Churchill Road
  UniSA Mawson Lakes via Churchill Road and Montague Road
  Armada Arndale Shopping Centre via Churchill Road and Days Road
  Tea Tree Plaza via North East Road and Reservoir Road
  Paradise Interchange via North East Road and Darley Road
  Paradise Interchange via Walkerville Terrace, Harris Road and McLauchlan Road
281K terminates at stop 17 O.G Road, Klemzig

Northern Feeder Services

  Salisbury to Gepps Cross via Port Wakefield Road, Mawson Lakes and Northbri Avenue.
  225M terminates at Mawson Lakes 
  Para Hills to Gepps Cross via Main North Road and Pooraka.
  Elizabeth to Salisbury North via Elizabeth South and Salisbury
  400A terminates at Salisbury Station
  Salisbury to Paralowie via Waterloo Corner Road
  Salisbury to Salisbury North via Waterloo Corner Road
  Salisbury-Paralowie Loop via Paralowie Plaza S/C
  404R deviates via Martins Road and Rundle Drive 
  Salisbury-Paralowie Loop via Paralowie Plaza S/C
  405R deviates via Martins Road and Rundle Drive 
  Mawson Lakes to Salisbury via Burton Road
  411B operates Salisbury station to Mawson Interchange only 
  411U extends to UNISA Mawson Lakes Campus 
  Salisbury to Greenwith via Salisbury Heights
  415H terminates at stop 63 Target Hill Road, Salisbury Heights 
  415V extends to Golden Grove 
  Salisbury to BAE Systems in Edinburgh via RAAF Base Edinburgh
  Salisbury to Elizabeth via Hillbank
  Elizabeth to Munno Para station via Craigmore
  Elizabeth to Smithfield via Craigmore
  Elizabeth to Smithfield via Craigmore
  Elizabeth-Muno Para Loop via Craigmore
  Elizabeth to Smithfield via Andrews Farm
  451A terminates at stop 74A Edgecombe Road, Davoren Park 
  Elizabeth to Smithfield via Andrews Farm
  452A terminates at stop 78D Peachey Road, Smithfield Plains 
  452W terminates at stop 71 Heytesbury Road, Davoren Park 
  Elizabeth-Muno Para West Loop
  Elizabeth-Angle Vale Loop via Muno Para West
  Gawler-Hewett Loop via Dawkins Avenue
  Gawler-Gawler East Loop via East Terrace
  Gawler-Evanston Clockwise Loop via Jack Cooper Drive
  493T terminates at Tambelin station 
  Gawler-Evanston Anti-Clockwise Loop via Jack Cooper Drive
  494T terminates at Tambelin Station 
  Salisbury to Elizabeth via Virginia

Southern Routes

City Routes 
  Glenelg via Richmond Road and Mooringe Avenue
  167C terminates a Camden Park
  Glenelg via Richmond Road and Harvey Avenue
  Urrbrae via Duthy Street, Cross Road and Waite Road
  Mitcham Square via Fullarton Road and Princes Road
  171A terminates at Highgate
  Kingswood via Duthy Street and Harrow Road
  Blackwood via Fullarton Road, Goodwood Road and Shepherds Hill Road
  Glenelg via Unley Road, Grange Road and Raglan Avenue
  190B terminates at Unley Shops
  Blackwood via Belair Road, Upper Sturt Road and Hawthorndene Drive.
  Blackwood via Belair Road, Upper Sturt Road and Hawthorndene Drive. (Designated F stop; stop 12 Belair Road)
  Blackwood via Belair Road, Main Road and Hawthorndene Drive.
  Blackwood via Belair Road, Main Road and Hawthorndene Drive. (Designated F stop; stop 12 Belair Road)
  Coromandel Valley via Belair Road,  running express from stop P1 Pultney Street, to stop 23 Belair Road then only servicing stops 26, 28, 31 and 34.
  Marion Interchange via King William Road, Eliza Place and Miller Street
 200B deviates via Boothby Street, Clapham
 200C terminates at stop 20, Boothby Street, Clapham
  Marion Interchange via Everard Avenue, Towers Terrace and Oaklands Road
  241A terminates at Oaklands Park
  Hove via Anzac Highway, Morphett Road and Dunrobin Road
  Marion Interchange via Anzac Highway, Hendrie Street and Diagonal Road.
  Marion Interchange via Anzac Highway, Hendrie Street and Diagonal Road. (Designated F stop; stop 11A Marion Road)
  Marion Interchange via Anzac Highway, Brighton Road and Sturt Road
  Brighton Station via Anzac Highway, Brighton Road and Sturt Road.  "(Designated F stop; 21 Anzac Highway)" 
  Marion Interchange via Anzac Highway, Brighton Road and Dunrobin Road
  Marion Interchange via Anzac Highway, King George Avenue and Seacombe Road
  265W operates to Somerton Park only
 265B operates to Brighton Station only
  Flinders University via South Road
  Old Reynella via South Road, Ocean Boulevard and Patpa Drive
 720H operates via the FMC
 720M terminates at Marion Interchange 
  Noarlunga Centre via Main South Road, Panalatinga Road and Beach Road.
  Noarlunga Centre via Main South Road, Panalatinga Road and Beach Road. (Designated F stop; stop 26 South Road)
 721X operates Noarlunga Centre to City running express from Stop 40 Panalatinga Road
 721A operates Noarlunga Centre to Old Reynella only
 721L operates Noarlunga Centre to Lonsdale, South Australia only
 721R operates FMC to Old Reynella only
  Noarlunga Centre via Main South Road, Panalatinga Road and States Road.
  Noarlunga Centre via Main South Road, Panalatinga Road and States Road. (Designated F stop; stop 26 South Road)
 722X operates Noarlunga Centre to City running express from Stop 40 Panalatinga road
 722A Noarlunga Centre to Old Reynella only
 722L operates Noarlunga Centre to Lonsdale, South Australia only 
  Noarlunga Centre via Main South Road, Chandlers Hill Road and Flaxmill Road. (Designated F stop; stop 26 South Road)
 723X operates Woodcroft to City via Southern Expressway and running express from stop 39 Regency Road
  Noarlunga Centre via Main South Road, Acre Avenue and Brodie Road. (Designated F stop; stop 26 South Road) 
  Aberfoyle Park to Bedford Park via Black Road and Manning Road. Then continues as route G10 to Blair Athol via City
 G20X operates Aberfoyle Park to City running express from stop 25 Ayliffes Road
  Aberfoyle Park via Black Road and Manning Road.  designated F stop is stop 26 Ayliffes Road. 
  Aberfoyle Park to Bedford Park via Black Road and Hub Drive. Then continues as route G10 to Blair Athol via City
 G21X operates Aberfoyle Park to City running express from stop 25 Ayliffes Road
  Aberfoyle Park via Black Road and Hub Drive.  designated F stop is stop 26 Ayliffes Road. 
  Aberfoyle Park via Goodwood Road and Happy Valley Drive
  Blackwood via Goodwood Road and Shepherds Hill Road  designated F stop, stop 26 Shepards Hill Road

Feeder Routes 
  Aberfoyle Park to Marion Interchange via Flagstaff Road
  Aberfoyle Park to Marion Interchange via Coromandel Valley and Blackwood Station
 600A terminates at Aberfoyle Hub Interchange
 600B terminates at Blackwood Station 
 600S operates Blackwood Station to stop 26 Shepards Hill Road, Bedford Park 
  Aberfoyle Park to Marion Interchange via Coromandel Valley and Blackwood Station
 601A terminates at Aberfoyle Hub Interchange
 601B terminates at Blackwood Station
  Darlington to Blackwood Station via Coromandel Valley and Flagstaff Hill Road
  Marion Interchange to Marino via Seacombe Road
  Flinders University to Hallett Cove Beach station via Trott Park and Brighton Road
 681A terminates at stop 47 Awonga Road 
  Hallett Cove Beach station to Shiedow Park via Hallett Cove Shopping Centre
  Hallett Cove Beach station to Hallett Cove South (Freebairn Drive) via Cormorant Drive
  Noarlunga Centre to Old Reynella via Sherriffs Road and Galloway Road
  Noarlunga Centre to Old Reynella via Main South Road, Acre Avenue and Brodie Road.
  725A does not connect with a city bus 
  725B terminates at Southgate Plaza
  Colonnades Shopping Centre to Marion Interchange via Flaxmill Road and Bluehills Road
  733C operates Noarlunga Centre to Woodcroft Community Centre 
  733G operates Noarlunga Centre to Stop 33 Main South Road, O'Halloran Hill 
  Colonnades Shopping Centre to Marion Interchange via Sherriffs Road, Galloway Road, Trott Park and Brighton Road
  734S deviates via Lonsdale station 
  Old Reynella to Chandlers Hill via Aberfoyle Park and Chandlers Hill Road
  Colonnades Shopping Centre to Maslin Beach via Commercial Road and Seaford
  Noarlunga Centre/Hackham West Anti-Clockwise Loop via Honeypot Road
  Noarlunga Centre/Hackham West Clockwise Loop via Honeypot Road
  Noarlunga Centre/Seaford Anti-Clockwise Loop via Esplanade and Old Noarlunga
  Noarlunga Centre/Seaford Clockwise Loop via Old Noarlunga and Esplanade
  Colonnades Shopping Centre to Sellicks Beach via Old Coach Road and Aldinga
  750A terminates at Aldinga 
  750R terminates at Seaford 
  Seaford to Sellicks Beach via Main South Road and Aldinga. Express to/from Aldinga Shopping Centre
  Noarlunga Centre to Aldinga Shops via McLaren Vale and Willunga
  751C terminates at Seaford S/C 
  751A terminates at Colonnades Shopping Centre 
  751H terminates at Noarlunga Hospital 
  751W terminates at Willunga
  751R operates Noarlunga Centre to Seford 
  McLaren Vale to McLaren Flat via Oakley Road. Connects with route 751 at McLaren Vale stop 92.
  Willunga High School to Aldinga Beach via Aldinga 
  Aldinga Beach to Seaford via Willunga High School and McLaren Vale
  Seaford to Port Willunga via McLaren Vale, Willunga and Willunga High School.

Adelaide Hills Buses 
All buses starting with the number "8"

City Buses 

  Burnside via Greenhill Road
  ‘’’Carey Gully’’’ via Greenhill Road
  Stirling via Greenhill Road
  Lobethal via Verdun and Woodside  designated F stop, stop 14 Glen Osmond Road from city and stop 13 Glen Osmond rd to city 
  Mount Barker via South Eastern Freeway  express to stop 62 
  Nairne via Hahndorf  designated F stop; stop 14 Glen Osmond Rd from city; stop 13 Glen Osmond rd to city 
  Nairne via Mount Barker and South Eastern Freeway.  express to stop 62 
  Mount Barker via Bridgewater and Hahndorf
  Glen Osmond via Glen Osmond Road
  Aldgate via Crafers
  Aldgate via Crafers  designated F stop, stop 14 Glen Osmond Road from city and stop 13 Glen Osmond Road to city 
  Mount Barker via Crafers and Hahndorf
  Mount Barker via Crafers and Hahndorf  designated F stop, stop 14 Glen Osmond Road from city and stop 13 Glen Osmond Road to city 
  Aldgate via Crafers, Pomona Road, Stirling, and Heathfield.

Adelaide Hills Feeder Services 
  Crafers to Clealand Wildlife Park via Mount Lofty
  Verdun to Lobethal via Oakbank
  834A via Onkaparinga Valley rd and does not service Woodside 
  Mount Barker to Lobethal via Oakbank
  835A via Onkaparinga Valley rd and does not service Woodside 
  Mount Barker to Nairne via Littlehampton
  Aldgate to Macclesfield via Meadows
  Mount Barker to Strathalbyn via Wistow
  852L operates Cornerstone College to Langhorne Creek via Strathalbyn and Wistow 
  Stirling to Crafers via Pomona Road. 
  Crafers to Stirling via Pomona Road.
  Crafers to Stirling via Piccadilly
  866A does not service Piccadilly 
  866R services Stirling East and Piccadilly on request only 
  Urrbrae to Aldgate via Belair
  Aldgate to Blackwood via Belair
  Aldgate to Blackwood via Hawthorndene
  894H deviates via Longwood Road, Heathfield Road, Cricklewood Road, Churinga Road and Euston Road to service Heathfield High School 
  894S terminates in Stirling

Murray Bridge Buses 
Murray Bridge buses are operated by LinkSA and do not use Adelaide Metro fares. Please see www.linksa.com.au for more info.
  City to Murray Bridge via South Eastern Freeway.
  Mount Barker to Murray Bridge via South Eastern Freeway. connects with routes T840 or 864F to City at Mount Barker.
  Mount Barker to Murray Bridge via Kanmantoo and Callington. School Days only.
  Mount Barker to Murray Bridge via South Eastern Freeway and Mobilong Prison.

Cross Town Connector Services 
  Armada Arndale Shopping Centre to Glen Osmond via Cross Road and Marion Road
  100P terminates at stop 184 Marion Road, Plympton 
  100B terminates at stop 8A Marion Road, Brooklyn Park 
  100C operates stop 11A Marion Road, Plympton to stop 165 Cross Road, Highgate 
  100N operates stop 8H Marion Road, Marleston to stop 165 Cross Road, Highgate 
  Armada Arndale Shopping Centre to Flinders University via Marion Road
  Suburban Connector via Armada Arndale Shopping Centre, Cross Road, Portrush Road, Marion Road, Diagonal Road and Regency Road.
  300H terminates at stop 161/19 Portrush Road, Glen Osmond 
  300C terminates at stop 165 Cross Road, Urrbrae 
  300G terminates at Zone A Glenelg Interchange 
  300M operates between Zone D Glenelg Interchange and Zone A Marion S/C 
  300J terminates at stop 17 O.G Road, Klemzig 
  300U continues as route G10 after Marion S/C
  Port Adelaide to Tea Tree Plaza via Grand Junction Road and Helen Terrace
  Tea Tree Plaza to Elizabeth Station via Bridge Road, Salisbury station and Montague Road.
 560A Elizabeth station or stop 38A Bridge Road to Salisbury Station
 560B Elizabeth station to stop 37C Montague Road, Ingle Farm
 560P Detours via Muriel Drive, Carr Street and Bridge Road in Ingle Farm
  Ingle Farm (stop 37C Montague Road) to Mawson Lakes via UNISA Mawson Lakes and Mawson Lakes Boulevard.
  Paradise Interchange to Mile End South via St Bearnards Road and Greenhill Road

JetBuses
Buses that operate via Adelaide Airport

  Elizabeth Interchange to Adelaide Airport and Glenelg via Lyell McEwin Hospital, Golden Grove Interchange, Tea Tree Plaza Interchange, O-Bahn Busway, City, Sir Donald Bradman Drive, Adelaide Airport and Harbour Town
 J1A operates City to Adelaide Airport
  Adelaide Airport via Sir Donald Bradman Drive Express from City to Adelaide Airport. Uses a Bustech double deck bus.
  Greenwith to Harbour Town via Golden Grove Interchange, Tea Tree Plaza Interchange, O-Bahn Busway, City, Sir Donald Bradman Drive, Adelaide Airport and Harbour Town
  Westfield West Lakes to Westfield Marion via Adelaide Airport and Camden Park
  J7M terminates at stop 15 Mooringe Avenue, Camden Park, outside Camden Park bus depot. 
  Westfield West Lakes to Westfield Marion via Armada Arndale Shopping Centre, Adelaide Airport and Camden Park

After Midnight
After Midnight services operate only on Saturday nights/Sunday mornings after midnight:
  Golden Grove via O-Bahn and Golden Grove Road
  City via Sturt Road, Flinders Medical Centre and Goodwood Road. Returns as route N21 to Aberfoyle Park.
  Aberfoyle Park via Goodwood Road, Marion Interchange and Flagstaff Road. Returns as route N10 from Marion Interchange.
  Wattle Park via The Parade
  West Lakes Interchange via Henley Beach Road and Seaview Road
  Newton via Payneham Road and Montacute Road
  Ingle Farm via North East Road and Hampstead Road
  Gawler via Mawson Lakes, Salisbury Highway, Phillip Highway, Yorktown Road and Main North Road
  Semaphore via Torrens Road, Armada Arndale Shopping Centre, Hanson Road and Port Adelaide
  Marion Interchange via Anzac Highway, Glenelg and Brighton Road
  Salisbury via O-Bahn and Bridge Road
  Fairview Park via O-Bahn and Hancock Road. Continues as route N542
  Fairview Park to Tea Tree Gully via Yatala Vale Rd, Elizabeth Street and North East Road, setting down only until last passenger alights. No return journey. For an After Midnight service to Fairview Park use route N541.
  Moana via South Road, Marion Interchange, Old Reynella Interchange, Noarlunga Centre railway station and Commercial Road
  Mount Barker via South Eastern Freeway, Crafers, Stirling, Aldgate, Bridgewater and Hahndorf.

Free Buses 
The following buses are zero-fare, wheelchair-accessible circuit routes that service the Adelaide City Council area daily, on frequent routes:
 
 Bi-directional loop via North Terrace, Currie Street, Hutt Street, Halifax Street, Sturt Street, Grote Street, Morphett Street, Jeffcott Street, Ward Street, Hill Street, Tynte Street, Finiss Street and Frome Road

 
 Bi-directional loop via North Terrace, Currie Street, Hutt Street, Halifax Street, Sturt Street, Grote Street, Victoria Square, King William Street. This service operated under the '99C' only and it was only in 2014 that the name change took place. The 99C is a clockwise loop while the 99A is anti-clockwise.

Adelaide Oval Footy Express 
Adelaide Metro provide services between Adelaide Oval and areas across South Australia. Tickets for the games also act as the ticket to travel free on any Adelaide Oval Footy Express bus, train or tram, in order to alleviate overcrowding on regular services. Most services offer early arrival times and some routes will have services that leave an hour after the final siren. The locations in metropolitan Adelaide include:

  Greenwith to Adelaide Oval via O-Bahn
  St Agnes Depot to Adelaide Oval via O-Bahn
  Northgate to Adelaide Oval via Klemzig Interchange and O-Bahn
  Hope Valley to Adelaide Oval via Paradise Interchange and O-Bahn
  Salisbury East to Adelaide Oval via Paradise Interchange and O-Bahn
  Woodcroft Community Centre to Adelaide Oval via Main South Road
  South Adelaide Footy Club to Adelaide Oval via Main South Road
  Old Reynella to Adelaide Oval via Brighton station, Marion Centre Interchange and South Road
  Mount Barker to Adelaide Oval via South Eastern Freeway
  Aldgate to Adelaide Oval via South Eastern Freeway and Glen Osmond Road
  Paradise Interchange to Adelaide Oval via St Bernards Road and Magill Road
  Athelstone to Adelaide Oval via Payneham Road
  Burnside to Adelaide Oval via Greenhill Road
  Rosslyn Park to Adelaide Oval via The Parade
  Mawson Interchange to Adelaide Oval via Main North Road
  Elizabeth Shopping Centre to Adelaide Oval via Main North Road
  Rosewater to Adelaide Oval via Days Road and Torrens Road
  Port Adelaide and Outer Harbor to Adelaide Oval via Port Road
  West Lakes Centre Interchange to Adelaide Oval via Grange Road
  Henley Beach to Adelaide Oval via Henley Beach Road
  Blair Athol to Adelaide Oval via Prospect Road
  Ottoway to Adelaide Oval via Armada Arndale Shopping Centre and Hawker Street
  Aberfoyle Park to Adelaide Oval via Goodwood Road
  Morphettville Depot to Adelaide Oval via Marion Road
  Mitcham Square to Adelaide Oval via Unley Road
  Mitcham Square to Adelaide Oval via Fullarton Road
  Glenelg Interchange to Adelaide Oval via West Beach and Sir Donald Bradman Drive
  Oaklands Interchange to Adelaide Oval via Glenelg Oval and Anzac Highway

Train Routes

Main Lines 
 
 City to Belair via Adelaide Showgrounds, Mitcham, Eden Hills and Blackwood
 
 City to Gawler Central via Mawson Lakes, Salisbury, Elizabeth, Smithfield and Gawler
 City to Gawler via Mawson Lakes, Salisbury, Elizabeth and Smithfield (Monday to Friday only)
 City to Salisbury via Mawson Lakes (Monday to Friday only)
 Gawler Central to Gawler via Gawler Oval (Monday to Friday only)
 
 City to Seaford via Adelaide Showgrounds, Goodwood, Woodlands Park, Oaklands, Brighton, Hallett Cove and Noarlunga Centre
 
 City to Outer Harbor via Woodville, Port Adelaide, Glanville, Taperoo and Osborne
 City to Osborne via Woodville, Port Adelaide, Glanville and Taperoo (Monday to Friday only)

Branch Lines 
 
 City to Flinders via Woodlands Park 
 
 City to Grange via Croydon, Woodville and Albert Park

Tram Routes 

 
 Royal Adelaide Hospital to Glenelg via Adelaide railway station, Greenhill Road, South Road, South Plympton and Glengowrie
 Entertainment Centre to South Terrace via Adelaide railway station, Rundle Mall and Victoria Square (Monday to Friday Only)
 Festival Plaza to Glenelg via Rundle Mall and Victoria Square (weekends and event days only)
 Entertainment Centre to Botanic Garden via Royal Adelaide Hospital, Adelaide railway station and Art Gallery of South Australia

See also 
 Transport in South Australia
 Railways in Adelaide
 Buses in Adelaide
 Trams in Adelaide
 Adelaide Metro

References 

Adelaide
Bus routes
Bus routes, Adelaide